The Capitol District is a neighborhood adjacent to the state capitol in Harrisburg, Pennsylvania.  It is delineated by Forster St. to the North, Walnut St. to the South, 3rd St. to the East, and the Susquehanna River to the west. This neighborhood borders the large Pennsylvania State Capitol Complex and has easy access to the Downtown Harrisburg.  The Capital District is home to Saint Patrick's Cathedral, St. Stephen's Episcopal Cathedral, State Museum of Pennsylvania, the historic Harrisburg Area YMCA building, many beautiful houses, and several small bistros.

References

See also
List of Harrisburg neighborhoods

Neighborhoods in Harrisburg, Pennsylvania